Jhonny Alejandro Baldeón Parreño (born June 15, 1981) is an Ecuadorian association football midfielder who played in Argentina and Peru as well as in his native country.

References

 
 
 
 

1981 births
Living people
Ecuadorian footballers
Ecuadorian expatriate footballers
Ecuador international footballers
C.S.D. Independiente del Valle footballers
Barcelona S.C. footballers
S.D. Quito footballers
C.S.D. Macará footballers
C.D. ESPOLI footballers
Club Alianza Lima footballers
Talleres de Córdoba footballers
Expatriate footballers in Argentina
Expatriate footballers in Peru
Association football forwards